Shogun was the seventh album by the German heavy metal band Stormwitch, released in 1994.  It is probably the most controversial of Stormwitch's albums and poorly received by fans due to its almost entirely different sound, with progressive elements and very little of their classic heavy metal styles. It also marked the end of their original span which has lasted from 1982-1994. The album was the first to feature only one guitarist, making a four-member band.

The album is a concept album, based on James Clavell's novel; Shōgun. The lyrics all revolve around parts from the novel referring to both names and places. It is the second album in a row released by Stormwitch to feature a novel based concept, the first being War Of The Wizards.

Track listing
 "Stranded" - 7:10
 "Liar" - 6:21
 "Garden of Pain" - 5:54
 "Seven Faces (And Two Hearts)" - 6:45
 "Forbidden" - 4:16
 "Victory Is Mine" - 4:41
 "Let Lessons Begin" - 6:29
 "The King of Winds" - 4:35
 "She's the Sun" - 5:07
 "Good Times - Bad Times" - 9:39
 "I'll Never Forgive" - 8:04
 "Somewhere" - 5:10

Personnel
 Andy Mück alias Andy Aldrian – vocals
 Damir Uzunovic – guitars
 Martin Albrecht – bass
 Pete Langer – drums

1994 albums
Stormwitch albums